The 2021 Rupsha Communal Violence was an episode of communal violence in which some members of Bangladesh's Muslim majority and Hindu minority clashed, resulting in injuries and property damage. The event occurred on 8 August 2021 in Shiyali village, Ghatbhog Union, Rupsha Upazila, Khulna District, Bangladesh. Six temples and 58 houses were reportedly damaged, and at least 10 statues housed in Hindu temples were reportedly destroyed. Ten people were arrested in the aftermath of the violence.

Background 
The events occurred during a period of elevated inter-communal religious tension. Several days earlier, on August 4, violence had broken out in the nearby town of Bhong, after an 8 year old Hindu boy reportedly desecrated a madrasa. In response, a mob formed and stormed a temple of Ganesh.

Initiation of events 
On Friday, 8 August at around 9 PM, 25 to 30 male and female worshippers were going to Shiyali Mahasmashan from Purbapara temple while performing kirtan. On their way, they passed Shiyali's old Jami Mosque during the congregational prayer. The imam of the mosque, Hafez Maulana Nazim Uddin, Nazim Samaddar and 7 to 8 others, asked them to not sing or play drums near the mosque during the prayer. According to Nazim Uddin, one of the Hindus shoved him during the discussion, and the conflict escalated after this; the Hindus, however, denied this claim.

Violence 
The following day, on August 7, 2021, a mob formed which, according to the Hindu Unity Council, consisted of hundreds of people. Some locals claimed the mob originated from neighboring communities. The mob entered at least four temples and destroyed ten idols, and then reportedly damaged a number of houses and shops as well.

Aftermath 
Police were deployed to restore order and ten participants in the violence were arrested. The Bangladesh Hindu Unity Council described the attackers as "Islamic extremists" and called for more police action and media coverage of the event.

References

Anti-Hindu violence in Bangladesh
Khulna District
August 2021 events in Bangladesh